Payless (formerly known as Payless ShoeSource Inc.) is an international discount footwear chain. Established in 1956 by cousins Louis and Shaol Pozez, Payless was a privately held company owned by Blum Capital, and Golden Gate Capital. In 1961, it became a public company as the Volume Shoe Corporation which merged with The May Department Stores Company in 1979. In the 1980s, Payless was widely known in the U.S. for its Pro Wings line of discount sneakers, which often had Velcro straps instead of laces. In 1996, Payless became an independent publicly held company. In 2004, Payless announced it would exit the Parade chain and would close 100 Payless Shoe outlets. On August 17, 2007, the company acquired the Stride Rite Corporation and changed its name to Collective Brands, Inc. The company had a total revenue for 2011 of US$ 3.4 billion. The company also has a stunt premium banner, Palessi Shoes. Payless is currently owned by a group of investors led by Alden Global Capital and Axar Capital Management.

It was announced on May 1, 2012, that the company would be purchased by Wolverine World Wide, Blum Capital, and Golden Gate Capital for US$1.32 billion. On December 13, 2016 it was reported that all Payless shoe stores were to be closed in Australia with the loss of 730 jobs. On July 14, 2014, Authentic Brands Group acquired some assets from Payless's division Collective Licensing International, LLC, which included brands such as Airwalk, Hind sports clothing, Vision Street Wear, and Above The Rim.

In 2019, North American stores including their e-commerce platform filed for bankruptcy. The filing excluded stores outside of North America, which will continue to operate. Payless emerged from bankruptcy on January 16, 2020, and on August 18, 2020, Payless officially dropped 'ShoeSource' from its name, and launched its e-commerce website.



History

Acquisitions

Circa 1962–63, Volume Shoe company purchased the original Hill Brothers Shoe Company based in Kansas City, Missouri and converted all 25 of their stores to the "Payless" name. In 1971, Volume Shoe obtained the second Hill Brothers Shoe Store chain that was started in St. Louis, Mo in 1956 by Al Melnick and Sol Nathanson with the assistance and aid of the original Hill Brothers in Kansas City. The St. Louis version of "'Hill Brothers Self Service Shoe Store'" went from 3 to 103 stores in the Midwest and South between 1956 and 1971. Volume Shoe originally operated the 103 stores under the "Hill Brothers Self Service" name.

Starting in 1972, Volume Shoe began to consolidate stores in proximity and convert others to the "Payless" brand. The St. Louis operation of "'Hill Brothers Self Service'" stores were known for their bare bones minimalism and the slogan "two for five – man alive!", that is, women and children's shoes were two pair for five dollars.

Payless bought Picway Shoes from the Kobacker department store chain in 1994.

Key dates
 1956: Pay-Less National is founded in Topeka, Kansas, by two cousins, Louis and Shaol Pozez, to open self-service stores selling budget footwear.
 1962: The company goes public as Volume Distributors.
 1967: The company is renamed Volume Shoe Corporation; an accelerated expansion program is launched.
 1971: Volume Shoe Corp. acquires the St. Louis based Hill Brothers Self Service Shoe Store
 1978: The Payless ShoeSource name is adopted for the bulk of the company's retail outlets.
 1979: Volume Shoe is acquired by the May Department Stores Company.
 1991: The company name is changed to Payless ShoeSource, Inc.
 1996: May spins Payless off to shareholders, making it once again an independent, publicly traded firm.
 1997: The mid-priced shoe chain Parade of Shoes is acquired from J. Baker, Inc.; the first Canadian Payless stores open.
 1999: The firm launches e-commerce at payless.com; Payless opens locations on the sales floor inside Shopko discount stores, replacing J. Baker.
 2000: Payless enters into a joint venture to expand into the Central American region.
 2004: As part of a major restructuring, Payless announces that it will close down the Parade chain and close hundreds of Payless outlets.
 2012: Collective Brands Inc., which owns footwear brands such as Sperry Top-Sider and Keds as well as the retailer Payless, will be split in two by multiple buyers, Wolverine Worldwide, Blum Capital and Golden Gate Capital, in a purchase valued at $2 billion, including debt.
 2017: Payless ShoeSource filed for Chapter 11 bankruptcy and closed 673 stores nationwide.
 2019: Payless filed for a second bankruptcy and closed all their remaining stores in the United States and Canada, which was also coincidental with Shopko's own bankruptcy and liquidation.
2020: Payless emerges from bankruptcy and plans to re-launch a U.S. e-commerce site.
August 18, 2020: Payless announces relocation of company headquarters from Topeka, Kansas to Edgewater, Florida.

Expansion
On June 27, 2006, Payless announced that it was launching a new logo created to represent a more stylish, upscale and contemporary company. This is the first rollout of stores in 2012 and beyond.

 Canada: At the end of 2018, Payless had 248 stores in Canada, however, it was announced in February 2019 that all of the stores would be closed.
 Eastern Caribbean: In 2014, Payless opened its first store in St. Lucia at the Baywalk Mall in Gros-Islet. This is one of two Payless stores located on the island of St. Lucia. Antigua, Grenada, St. Kitts, Dominica and St. Vincent all have one store each.
 Australia: In 2013, Payless ShoesSource bought Payless Shoes Australia's full 150 stores, which has operated since 1980 out of administration. Previously, these two companies did not have any affiliation. On December 13, 2016, it was reported that all Payless shoe stores were to be closed in Australia with the loss of 730 jobs.
 Trinidad and Tobago: Payless has a total of 22 stores across Trinidad and Tobago, having first opened its doors in 2001.
 Barbados: In 2012, Payless expanded into the Barbados market by opening the first ten-employee store at Haggatt Hall, St. Michael. This has since grown to 5 stores across the island.
 Jamaica: Payless opened in Jamaica in January 2011, and today has a total of 15 stores on the island. 
 Philippines: As of March 2019, Payless has 76 stores in the Philippines.
 Indonesia, Singapore, and Malaysia: In April 2011, Payless launched its first store in Jakarta, Indonesia followed by one store in Kuala Lumpur and Singapore within the same year and under the same management. Payless operates 19 stores throughout Indonesia currently.
 Thailand: The Central Marketing Group (CMG), a business unit of the Central Group, has signed a franchise agreement with Kansas-based Payless that will see outlets next year in Bangkok – Chonburi, making Thailand its 15th franchise country. It will also adopt Payless's new Hot Zone format and purchase products directly from the seasonal assortments, with slight adjustments for local needs.
 United Arab Emirates: It belongs to AlShaya group in the UAE. It has opened different branches in Dubai Mall, Mirdif City Center and Sahara Center, and also in Bawadi Mall in Al-Ain City.

Collective Licensing International, LLC
Payless, operating as Collective Brands, Inc. formed a division called Collective Licensing International, LLC (CLI) in January 2004, which was based in Englewood, Colorado. CLI held and owned various clothing and sport brands, particularly "youth lifestyle brands" and board-sport brands such as Airwalk, Vision Street Wear, Sims, Lamar and LTD, World Snowboarding Championships, Sugarboards, Carve, genetic, Dukes, Rage, Ultra-Wheels, Hind, Spot Bilt and Skate Attack. The primary purpose of the division was to develop brands and provide them with marketing and branding guidance in various markets.

In 2010, CLI acquired Above The Rim from Reebok International for an undisclosed amount.

On July 14, 2014, Authentic Brands Group acquired some assets from Payless's division Collective Licensing International, LLC.

2017 bankruptcy
In April 2017, the company, struggling with the migration of retail shopping to e-commerce, filed for Chapter 11 bankruptcy. It planned to immediately liquidate nearly 400 stores in the United States and Canada. Prior to the bankruptcy, heavily loaded with debt due to a private equity buy out, the company's credit rating was downgraded by Moody's. It has $100 million in loans that will come due in the next five years.  The company's bankruptcy announcement was part of a trend of retail closures in 2016–2017 known as the retail apocalypse.

Payless emerged from bankruptcy court protection in August 2017. The company was the first among a group of retailers going through bankruptcy since 2016 to successfully complete the process of restructuring.

2019 bankruptcy and revival in 2020

On February 14, 2019, Payless filed for bankruptcy again for a second time and this time they closed all 2,100 stores in the United States by May 2019. On February 19, 2019, it announced would also close 248 stores in Canada. The 790 stores across Latin America and the other stores internationally would not be affected. Texas A&M University marketing professor and interim director Cheryl H. Bridges then surmised that Payless did not heed the changing retail landscape and "reinvent its stores" quickly enough to stay competitive in a more crowded market.

Payless emerged from bankruptcy on January 16, 2020, with plans to re-launch a U.S. e-commerce site. On August 18, 2020, Payless, officially dropping 'Shoesource' from its name, did relaunch its e-commerce website. It also announced plans to open between 300 and 500 free-standing stores in North America over the next five years.

References

External links
 Collective Brands corporate site
 New official website
Official website( )
 Palessi Shoes
 History of Payless ShoeSource, Inc. – FundingUniverse

1956 establishments in Kansas
2007 mergers and acquisitions
2012 mergers and acquisitions
Australian companies disestablished in 2016
American companies established in 1956
Clothing companies established in 1956
Retail companies established in 1956
Companies based in Topeka, Kansas
Companies formerly listed on the New York Stock Exchange
Companies that filed for Chapter 11 bankruptcy in 2017
Companies that filed for Chapter 11 bankruptcy in 2019
Footwear retailers of the United States
Footwear retailers
Retail companies of Canada
Retail companies of the Philippines
Shoe companies of Canada
Shoe companies of the United States
Re-established companies